Unilever Pakistan Limited, formerly Lever Brothers Pakistan Limited(), is a Pakistani fast-moving consumer goods company based in Karachi. It is a subsidiary of the British multinational company.

History 
The town of Rahim Yar Khan was the site chosen for setting up a personal care factory.

In the mid 1960s, the company shifted its headquarters to Karachi from the Rahim Yar Khan site.

In December 1980, the company got listed on the Karachi Stock Exchange.

It has four factories operating in the country.

Brands

Food and drinks
 Lipton (tea)
 Wall's ice cream
 Pearl Dust (tea)
 Knorr soup, noodles & meal mixes
 Cornetto ice cream
 Magnum ice cream
 Brooke Bond (tea)
 Fruttare
 Wall's Kid's Range

Personal care
 Clear - Anti-dandruff shampoo
 Close Up - Toothpaste
 Fair & Lovely - (cosmetic products)
 Lifebuoy (shampoo)
 Lifebuoy soap - Soap & handwash
 Lux - Soap, hand & bodywash
 Pond's - Talcs & beauty creams
 Rexona - Deoderants and Anti-perspirants
 Sunsilk - Shampoo
 Dove (soap)
 Pepsodent (toothpaste)
 Toni & Guy

Home care
 Comfort - fabric softeners
 Rin - detergent
 Surf Excel - detergent and gentle wash.
 Domex
 Vim

Former Brands 
In 2003, Unilever announced the strategic decision to sell off the Dalda brand in both India and Pakistan. In 2003, Bunge Limited acquired the Dalda brand from Hindustan Unilever Limited for reportedly under Rs 100 crore. On 30 March 2004, Unilever Pakistan accepted an offer of Rs. 1.33 billion for the sale of its Dalda brand and related business of edible oils and fats to the newly incorporated company Dalda Foods (Pvt.) Limited.

See also
 Wall's (ice cream)

References

External links
 Unilever Pakistan Limited Official website
 Unilever Official website (parent company)

Unilever companies
Food manufacturers of Pakistan
Pakistani subsidiaries of foreign companies
Manufacturing companies based in Karachi
1980s initial public offerings
Pakistani companies established in 1948
Privately held companies of Pakistan